Dieci may refer to:

 Dieci, Arad, commune in Arad County, Romania
 Dieci (song), song by Italian singer Annalisa
 Enzo Dieci (born 1934), Italian prelate of the Roman Catholic Church

See also 

 Deci